Vania King and Yaroslava Shvedova were the defending champions, but withdrew because of Shvedova's heat illness.
Andrea Hlaváčková and Lucie Hradecká won the title after defeating Katarina Srebotnik and Zheng Jie 6–1, 6–3 in the final.

Seeds
The top four seeds receive a bye into the second round.

Draw

Finals

Top half

Bottom half

External links
 Main draw

2012 WTA Tour
Women's Doubles

es:Masters de Cincinnati 2012 - dobles femeninos
id:Western & Southern Open 2012 – Ganda Putri
pl:Western & Southern Open 2012 - kobiety